Prosopium is a genus of freshwater whitefishes found in North America and parts of eastern Russia. It contains three fairly widespread species: the round whitefish, the pygmy whitefish, and the mountain whitefish. The remaining species, the Bonneville cisco, the Bonneville whitefish, and the Bear Lake whitefish are endemic to Bear Lake.

Species
There are currently six recognized species in this genus:

References

 
 Molly Hallock and Paul E. Mongillo, Washington Department of Fish and Wildlife "Washington State Status Report" (1998).

 
Extant Miocene first appearances
Ray-finned fish genera
Taxa named by David Starr Jordan